Irrigation games are cooperative games which model cost sharing problems on networks (more precisely, on rooted trees). The irrigation game is a transferable utility game assigned to a cost-tree problem. A common example of this cost-tree problems are the irrigation networks. The irrigation ditch is represented by a graph, its nodes are water users, the edges are sections of the ditch. There is a cost of maintaining the ditch (each section has an own maintenance cost), and we are looking for the fair division of the costs among the users. The irrigation games are  mentioned first by Aadland and Kolpin 1998, but the formal concept and the characterization of the game class is introduced by Márkus et al. 2011.

Mathematical definition 
The definition of Márkus et al. 2011 is the following:
A rooted tree is a graph in which any two vertices are connected by exactly one simple path, and one vertex has been designated the root, in which case the edges have a natural orientation, away from the root. For any   means  is an edge between vertices  such that .

Let . Then  and ) are called cost function and cost-tree respectively: for any    is the cost of joining player  to player .

Assume that the cost-tree problems have fixed, at least two, number of players. Let  be a cost-tree, and  be the set of the players (the vertices but the root). By this method for each cost-tree we can define a game, called irrigation game. Formally:

Definition (Irrigation game): For any cost-tree , let  be the player set, and for any coalition  (the empty sum is 0) let

Example 

Properties and Results 
Márkus et al. 2011 reported several important properties of the class of the irrigation games. First, the well-known class of the airport games is a proper subset of the class of irrigation games, since the airport games are defined on special rooted trees, on chains (see: Airport problem). Second, the class of irrigation games is a non-convex cone which is a proper subset of the finite convex cone spanned by the duals of the unanimity games, therefore every irrigation game is concave.

Márkus et al. 2011 also extended the Shapley and Young axiomatizations of the Shapley value to the class of irrigation games and showed that the Shapley value of an irrigation game is always in the core of the game.

References 

Cooperative games